Eugene Volokh (born February 29, 1968, as Yevhen Volodymyrovych Volokh) is an American legal scholar known for his scholarship in American constitutional law and libertarianism as well as his prominent legal blog The Volokh Conspiracy. Volokh is regarded as an expert on the First Amendment. He is the Gary T. Schwartz Professor of Law at the UCLA School of Law and is an affiliate at the law firm Schaerr Jaffe.

Early life and education
Volokh was born to a Jewish family residing in Kyiv, Ukraine—then part of the Soviet Union. He emigrated with his family to the United States at the age of seven. Volokh exhibited extraordinary mathematical abilities from an early age. At the age of 9, he was attending university-level mathematics and calculus courses after he was found studying differential equations on his own. When only 10 years 1 month old, he earned a 780 out of a possible 800 on the math portion of what is now called the SAT-I. He is one of the youngest children to have achieved this feat.

At the age of 12, he began working as a computer programmer and was enrolled as a sophomore at UCLA. He attended the Hampshire College Summer Studies in Mathematics.  As a junior at UCLA, he earned $480 a week as a programmer for 20th Century Fox. During this period, Volokh's achievements were featured in an episode of OMNI: The New Frontier, a television series hosted by Peter Ustinov. He graduated from UCLA at age 15 with a Bachelor of Science degree in mathematics and computer science.

In 1989, Volokh entered the UCLA Law School, graduating in 1992 with a Juris Doctor.

Career 
After law school, Volokh clerked for Judge Alex Kozinski of the U.S. Court of Appeals for the Ninth Circuit, then for Justice Sandra Day O'Connor of the U.S. Supreme Court. Upon completing his Supreme Court clerkship in 1994, UCLA hired Volokh as a professor of law. He has remained there ever since. 
As of 2018, he also held the position of Gary T. Schwartz Professor of Law, and was an academic affiliate at the law firm Mayer Brown. As of 2023, he was an affiliate of trial and appellate law firm Schaerr Jaffe.

Politics
Volokh is commonly described as politically conservative or libertarian. In 2012, one commentator described Volokh's politics as "soft libertarian", and Volokh as an "unpredictable libertarian-leaning" writer.

In the 2008 presidential election, Volokh supported former Tennessee Senator Fred Thompson, saying Thompson had good instincts on legal issues and that he preferred Thompson's positions on the First Amendment and political speech to John McCain's sponsorship of campaign finance reform. Volokh also liked Thompson's position in favor of individual gun ownership. He noted that Thompson "takes federalism seriously, and he seems to have a fairly deep-seated sense that there is a real difference between state and federal power."

Volokh is a supporter of same-sex marriage.

Writing
Volokh's article about "The Commonplace Second Amendment", was cited by Supreme Court Justice Antonin Scalia's majority opinion in the landmark Second Amendment case of District of Columbia v. Heller, and he has been quoted in the media on gun laws. Volokh advocates free speech on campus, religious freedom, and other First Amendment issues, and has been widely quoted as an expert. He opposes affirmative action, having worked as a legal advisor to California's Proposition 209 campaign. Volokh is a critic of what he sees as the overly broad operation of American workplace harassment laws, including those relating to sexual harassment.

On his weblog, Volokh addresses a wide variety of issues, with a focus on politics and law.

Volokh's non-academic work has been published in The Wall Street Journal, Los Angeles Times, The New York Times, Slate, and other publications. He was a contributing blogger at The Huffington Post from 2005-2012.

Selected works

Books

Articles

See also
 List of law clerks of the Supreme Court of the United States (Seat 8)

References

External links

 The Volokh Conspiracy website
 Volokh's webpage at UCLA
 

American bloggers
American legal scholars
American legal writers
American libertarians
Copyright scholars
First Amendment scholars
Law clerks of the Supreme Court of the United States
HuffPost writers and columnists
Jewish American writers
Legal educators
People from Greater Los Angeles
Lawyers from Los Angeles
Soviet emigrants to the United States
Soviet Jews
University of California, Los Angeles alumni
UCLA School of Law alumni
UCLA School of Law faculty
1968 births
Living people
Federalist Society members
American male bloggers